Horizon Health Network is one of two health authorities in the Canadian province of New Brunswick, the other being Vitalité Health Network.

Horizon Health Network delivers medical care on behalf of the Government of New Brunswick to the central and southern portions of the province through 12 hospitals and 28 health centres/clinics while providing a variety of programs and services.

Horizon Health Network is headquartered in Fredericton, New Brunswick.

Hospitals
Horizon Health Network operates the following hospitals:

 Charlotte County Hospital (St. Stephen, NB)
 Dr. Everett Chalmers Regional Hospital (Fredericton, NB)
 Grand Manan Hospital (North Head, NB on Grand Manan Island)
 Hotel-Dieu of St. Joseph (Perth-Andover, NB)
 Miramichi Regional Hospital (Miramichi, NB)
 Oromocto Public Hospital (Oromocto, NB)
 Sackville Memorial Hospital (Sackville, NB)
 Saint John Regional Hospital (Saint John, NB)
 St. Joseph's Hospital (Saint John, NB)
 Sussex Health Centre (Sussex, NB)
 The Moncton Hospital (Moncton, NB)
 Upper River Valley Hospital (Waterville, NB)

Former health authorities
Horizon Health Network was established by the provincial government effective September 1, 2008 through the dissolution and merger of the following health authorities:

 South-East Regional Health Authority
 River Valley Health
 Atlantic Health Sciences Corporation
 Miramichi Regional Health Authority

Quick facts
 Horizon Health serves the province of New Brunswick but through inter-provincial agreements, also provides referral services for part of northeastern Nova Scotia (Cumberland County) as well as Prince Edward Island
 One of the largest employers in New Brunswick
 A $1 billion plus organization
 Approximately 13,000 staff members and 1,000 physicians
 Over 100 facilities, clinics and offices
 3,500 volunteers, auxiliary and alumnae members
 20 foundations
 19 auxiliaries and alumnae

Statistics (2010–2011)

Number of:

 medical residents - 300
 hospitals - 12
 hospital beds - 1,600
 admissions - 55,000 (acute, rehab and chronic)
 inpatient days - 580,000 (acute, rehab and chronic)
 surgeries completed per year - 45,000
 births - 5,400

References

External links

Health regions of New Brunswick
Companies based in Fredericton
Crown corporations of New Brunswick
Organizations established in 2008
2008 establishments in New Brunswick